Yuriy Nikolaevich Lituyev (April 11, 1925 – February 3, 2000) was a Soviet athlete who competed mainly in the 400 metre hurdles. He trained in Leningrad and later in Moscow at the Armed Forces sports society.

Lituyev took part in the second world war, where he was a battery commander. He competed for the USSR in the 1952 Summer Olympics held in Helsinki, Finland in the 400 metre hurdles where he won the silver medal. In 1953, he broke the world record in the 400m hurdles. He also competed in the men's 400 metres (flat) event in 1952.

References

External links

 Biography

1925 births
2000 deaths
Russian male hurdlers
Soviet male hurdlers
Olympic silver medalists for the Soviet Union
Athletes (track and field) at the 1952 Summer Olympics
Athletes (track and field) at the 1956 Summer Olympics
Olympic athletes of the Soviet Union
Armed Forces sports society athletes
European Athletics Championships medalists
Medalists at the 1952 Summer Olympics
Olympic silver medalists in athletics (track and field)